I'm Alive and on Fire is a 2001 album by Canadian rock band Danko Jones. It collects tracks the band recorded from 1996 to 1999, including several that appeared on the EPs Danko Jones and My Love is Bold.

Track listing
"Rock Shit Hot" – 1:27
"Samuel Sin" – 1:19
"Bounce" – 3:05
"Sugar Chocolate" – 1:54
"I'm Alive and on Fire" – 1:16
"The Mango Kid" – 3:33
"Sex Change Shake" – 2:11
"Cadillac" – 2:10
"Dr. Evening" – 2:39
"Too Much Trouble" – 1:07
"New Woman" – 1:44
"Womanbound" – 2:39
"My Love Is Bold" – 4:54

All songs are written by Danko Jones (SOCAN)

Credits
tracks 1, 4, 5, 8, 9, 10, 11: recorded by Peter Hudson at Halam, 1996-1998.
tracks 6, 7, 12: recorded by Jeff McMurrich at Signal to Noise, 1999.
tracks 2, 3, 13: recorded by Eric Ratz at Vespa and Rob Sanzo at Signal to Noise, 1999.
mastered by Jon Drew.
sleeve design (alternative cover) by garytaxali.com & gregmably.com
photography by louiepalu.com

(as credited in inside of sleeve)

References

Danko Jones albums
2001 compilation albums